The Port de Venasque is a mountain pass in the Pyrenees. It lies on the border between France and Spain and is a popular border crossing point for mountaineers and walkers. It can be reached in about two to three hours from the Hospice de France, South of Bagnères-de-Luchon in France.

Mountain passes of the Pyrenees
Mountain passes of Spain
France–Spain border crossings
Mountain passes of Haute-Garonne